A Nun Cares for a Soldier in a Cloister is an 1822 painting by Claudius Jacquand, which has been in the Museum of Fine Arts of Lyon since 2015. It is one of his earliest surviving works. The cloister is modelled on that at the palais Saint-Pierre in Lyon, which now houses the Museum of Fine Arts.

It is one of the first paintings by Claudius Jacquand, which exists today. It has a size of 42 × 32 cm. It represents, as its name suggests, a soldier and a nun, who are located in the cloister of the Palais Saint-Pierre in Lyon, a building which now houses the Museum of Fine Arts of Lyon.

References

Sources
http://www.peintures-descours.fr/oeuvres/un-soldat-soigne-par-une-religieuse-dans-un-cloitre-vue-du-cloitre-du-palais-saint-pierre-1822

1820s paintings
French paintings
Nuns in fiction
Paintings in the collection of the Museum of Fine Arts of Lyon